Toivo "Topi" Ilmo Kalevi Sukari (April 8, 1954 in Mynämäki) is a Finnish businessman. He is the founder and largest shareholder of Maskun Kalustetalo and Ideapark. Sukari also owns the shopping mall chain stores Masku Koti and Sukarin Lomarakennus. Sukari comes from a Laestadian family and he has seven siblings. His father was a small-time farmer and entrepreneur. Sukari's wife is named Eeva and they have five children.

References

External links
Helsingin Sanomat: Toivo Sukari

1954 births
Living people
People from Mynämäki
Laestadians